Miguel José Ferrer (February 7, 1955 – January 19, 2017) was an American actor. His breakthrough role was as Bob Morton in the 1987 film RoboCop. Other film roles include Quigley in Blank Check (1994), Harbinger in Hot Shots! Part Deux (1993), Shan Yu in Mulan (1998), Eduardo Ruiz in Traffic (2000) and Vice President Rodriguez in Iron Man 3 (2013). Ferrer's notable television roles include FBI Agent Albert Rosenfield on Twin Peaks (1990–1991, 2017), Tarakudo on Jackie Chan Adventures (2000–2005), Dr. Garret Macy on Crossing Jordan (2001–2007) and NCIS Assistant Director Owen Granger on NCIS: Los Angeles (2012–2017).

Early life
Ferrer was born on February 7, 1955, in Santa Monica, California, the oldest of five children of Academy Award-winning Puerto Rican actor José Ferrer and singer Rosemary Clooney, who was of English, Irish and German descent. Ferrer's siblings were sisters Maria and Monsita, and brothers Gabriel (later the husband of singer Debby Boone) and actor Rafael. He also had an older half-sister, Letty (Leticia) Ferrer, from his father José's prior marriage to Uta Hagen. He was the cousin of actor George Clooney and the nephew of journalist Nick Clooney. Ferrer was raised in Hollywood and Beverly Hills and attended Beverly Hills High School. As a teenager, his interests tended toward music; he played the drums on Keith Moon's Two Sides of the Moon. After high school, Ferrer studied acting at the Beverly Hills Playhouse.

Career
Ferrer's friend Bill Mumy cast him as a drummer in the series Sunshine, his first television role. Ferrer was also Mumy's bandmate in Seduction of the Innocent, a band that also consisted of Steve Leialoha, and Max Allan Collins. Sharing a love of comics Ferrer and Mumy co-created  Comet Man and Trypto the Acid Dog plus co-wrote the Marvel Graphic Novel The Dreamwalker.

Ferrer began his acting career in the early 1980s, making guest appearances on episodic television. He played the younger version of his father's character on Magnum, P.I. in 1981. In 1983, he was given a small part as a waiter in The Man Who Wasn't There. He also had a minor role in Star Trek III: The Search for Spock (1984) as the U.S.S. Excelsior helm officer. In 1984, he directed the Mark Medoff play “When Ya Coming Back, Red Ryder?” at the Coconut Grove Playhouse in Miami, Florida. He had a major role in the 1987 action film RoboCop as the corporate executive Bob Morton, the young, ambitious executive of Omni Consumer Products' Security Concepts and project leader of the RoboCop program. Ferrer's notable later roles include a sinister biker in Valentino Returns, an overzealous engineer in DeepStar Six (1989), a resourceful vigilante in Revenge (1990), Commander Arvid Harbinger in the comedy Hot Shots! Part Deux (1993), Lloyd Henreid in the Stephen King miniseries The Stand (1994), and a drug informant in Traffic (2000). He occasionally took on lead parts as well, such as The Harvest and The Night Flier.

In the early 1990s, Ferrer appeared on three primetime TV series simultaneously: as D.A. Todd Spurrier in Shannon's Deal (1989–1991), as Cajun cop Beau Jack Bowman in Broken Badges (1990–1991), and as cynical, wittily abrasive FBI forensics specialist Albert Rosenfield in Twin Peaks (1990–91). Ferrer reprised the role of Rosenfield in the film Twin Peaks: Fire Walk with Me (1992). Ferrer played a super-villain called "The Weatherman" in the failed 1997 TV pilot, Justice League of America. Later in the same year, he provided the voice for a similar character, the Weather Wizard, in the Superman: The Animated Series episode "Speed Demons". In 1999, Ferrer voiced Aquaman in another Superman: Animated episode, "A Fish Story." The same year, at the 41st Grammy Awards, Ferrer was nominated for "Best Spoken Word Album for Children" in Disney's The Lion King II, "Simba's Pride Read-Along." He was also the protagonist of the American rock band Toto's music video for the song "I Will Remember", appearing alongside actor Edward James Olmos.

Ferrer again played a medical examiner on the small screen, Dr. Garret Macy, in the television crime/drama series Crossing Jordan (2001–07). In August 2003, Ferrer made his New York stage debut in the off-Broadway production of The Exonerated. In 2004, Ferrer performed as the voice of the Heretic leader in the video game Halo 2. Ferrer took voice-over roles in the TV series Robot Chicken (2006) and American Dad! (2007). He played Jonas Bledsoe on NBC's Bionic Woman series and in 2009 also starred in another NBC series, Kings, as a military commander of Gath.

Ferrer played Los Angeles Police Lieutenant Felix Valdez in the 2011 Lifetime police procedural drama, The Protector. Also, in 2011, he had a multiple-episode guest role on the final season of Desperate Housewives. Signed to a recurring role in NCIS: Los Angeles as Naval Criminal Investigative Service Assistant Director Owen Granger, Ferrer was promoted to a series regular for the fifth season on February 6, 2013. He also appeared in the 2013 film Iron Man 3 as the Vice President. Ferrer reprised his role of Albert Rosenfield in the 2017 revival of Twin Peaks.

Death 
On January 19, 2017, Ferrer died at his Santa Monica home from heart failure and complications of throat cancer at the age of 61. At the time of his death, Ferrer was married to producer Lori Weintraub. He had two sons and two stepsons. Ferrer is buried at Santa María Magdalena de Pazzis Cemetery in San Juan, Puerto Rico, next to his father José Ferrer.

Legacy
Miguel O'Hara, the alter ego of the Marvel Comics superhero Spider-Man 2099, was named after Ferrer by his friend, writer Peter David, who co-created the character.

The seventh episode of the third season of Young Justice: Outsiders was dedicated to him. Ferrer had voiced the character Vandal Savage in the first two seasons. As a result of his death, David Kaye took over Ferrer's role as Savage as well as his role as Jonathan Rook/Stretch Monster in Stretch Armstrong and the Flex Fighters.

The Adventure Time: Distant Lands special "Together Again" was also dedicated to him, as well as Polly Lou Livingston, Michel Lyman, and Maureen Mlynarczyk. Ferrer voiced the character Death in the series.

Filmography

Film

Television

Video games

Music video

See also

 List of Puerto Ricans

References

External links
 
 Voice chasers
 The A.V. Club interview

1955 births
2017 deaths
20th-century American male actors
21st-century American male actors
American male film actors
American male television actors
American male voice actors
American people of English descent
American people of German descent
American people of Irish descent
American people of Puerto Rican descent
Burials at Santa María Magdalena de Pazzis Cemetery
Deaths from cancer in California
Deaths from throat cancer
Ferrer family (acting)
Male actors from Santa Monica, California
Outstanding Performance by a Cast in a Motion Picture Screen Actors Guild Award winners
Audiobook narrators